Midgic is a rural community in Westmorland County, New Brunswick, Canada.

Located in the Sackville Parish approximately 8 kilometres east of Sackville, Midgic defines the eastern boundary of the Tantramar Marshes.
  
Population: Approximately 300

History

Notable people

See also
List of communities in New Brunswick

References

Communities in Westmorland County, New Brunswick